Willi Padge (born 4 October 1943) is a German rower who competed for the United Team of Germany in the 1960 Summer Olympics.

He was born in Mölln.

In 1960, he was the coxswain of the West German boat which won the gold medal in the eights event.

External links
 

1943 births
Living people
People from Mölln, Schleswig-Holstein
People from the Province of Schleswig-Holstein
West German male rowers
Coxswains (rowing)
Sportspeople from Schleswig-Holstein
Olympic rowers of the United Team of Germany
Rowers at the 1960 Summer Olympics
Olympic gold medalists for the United Team of Germany
Olympic medalists in rowing
Medalists at the 1960 Summer Olympics
Recipients of the Silver Laurel Leaf
European Rowing Championships medalists